is a passenger railway station in the city of Asahi, Chiba Japan, operated by the East Japan Railway Company (JR East).

Lines
Shiosai limited express services between Tokyo and  also stopping at this station.

Station layout
The station consists of a side platform and an island platform, connected by a footbridge. The station has a Midori no Madoguchi staffed ticket office.

Platforms

History
On 1 September 1907, the Sōbu Railway was nationalised, becoming part of the Japanese Government Railway (JGR). After World War II, the JGR became the Japan National Railways (JNR). The station name was renamed Asahi Station on 1 October 1959. Scheduled freight operations were suspended from 1 July 1973. The station was absorbed into the JR East network upon the privatization of the Japan National Railways (JNR) on 1 April 1987.

Passenger statistics
In fiscal 2019, the station was used by an average of 1756 passengers daily (boarding passengers only).

Surrounding area
 
 Asahi General Hospital 
 Chiba Prefectural Eastern Library
 Chiba Toso Cultural Center
 Chiba Prefectural Asahi Agricultural High School

See also
 List of railway stations in Japan

References

External links

 JR East station information 

Railway stations in Japan opened in 1897
Railway stations in Chiba Prefecture
Sōbu Main Line
Asahi, Chiba